Cenangium ferruginosum is a species of fungus which infects young twigs of especially older pines (Pinus sylvestris). It, along with Cenangium atropurpureum, causes the disease Cenangium canker. The parasite lives under the bark of the trunk and spreads out further i.e. bark of branches up to the fresh twigstops of needles. The needles turn brown at the base, and the needles on the twigtop die off in time.

References

Helotiaceae
Fungi described in 1818